Physetica homoscia is a species of moth of the family Noctuidae. It is endemic to New Zealand and is found throughout New Zealand including in the Auckland Islands. This species inhabits places where its host plants are common and this includes costal dune habitat. It lives at a wide range of altitudes from sea-level up to at least 1750 m. The larvae of P. homoscia feed on Ozothamnus leptophyllus and Ozothamnus vauvilliersii. They are very active and drop to the ground when disturbed. Larvae are parasitised by a species of fly. This species pupates in the soil and the pupa life stage lasts for approximately 6 weeks. The adult moths are on the wing from September to June and are attracted to light. The adults of P. homoscia might possibly be confused with Ichneutica moderata however this latter species lacks the small white dots on the forewing veins of P. homoscia. Adults might also be confused with P. temperata but P. homoscia is significantly larger in size.

Taxonomy 

This species was first described by Edward Meyrick in 1887 and named Mamestra homoscia. In 1898 George Hudson placed this species within the genus Melanchra. George Hampson thinking he was describing a new species, named this moth Hyssia sminthistis in 1905. Meyrick synonymised this latter name into Melanchra homoscia. In 1971 J. S. Dugdale placed this species in the genus Graphania. In 1988 Dugdale confirmed this placement in his Catalogue of New Zealand Lepidoptera. In 2017 Robert Hoare undertook a review of New Zealand Noctuinae and placed this species in the genus Physetica. The male holotype specimen was collected by George Hudson in Wellington and is held at the Natural History Museum, London.

Description

Dugdale described the larva of this species as follows:

Meyrick originally described the species as follows:
The wingspan of the adult male is between 29.5 and 43 mm and the adult female is between 35 and 46 mm. P. homoscia has a plain brown coloured forewing and older specimens can possibly be confused with Ichneutica moderata. However this latter species lacks the small white dots on the forewing veins that are present on the forewings of  P. homoscia. It might also be confused with P. temperata however P. homoscia is significantly larger in size.

Distribution 
This species is endemic to New Zealand. It is found throughout New Zealand including in the Auckland Islands.

Habitat 
This species inhabits places where its host plants are common and this includes costal dune habitat. It lives at a wide range of altitudes from sea-level up to at least 1750 m.

Behaviour 
The larvae are very active and drop to the ground when disturbed. The adult moths are on the wing from September to June and are attracted to light.

Life history and host species

Larvae of P. homoscia feed on Ozothamnus leptophyllus and Ozothamnus vauvilliersii. Hudson states that the larvae are parasitised by a species of fly. The larvae pupate in the soil and the pupa life stage lasts for approximately 6 weeks.

References

Hadeninae
Moths of New Zealand
Endemic fauna of New Zealand
Moths described in 1887
Taxa named by Edward Meyrick
Endemic moths of New Zealand